Anax speratus, the orange emperor,  is a species of dragonfly in the family Aeshnidae. It is found in Angola, Botswana, the Democratic Republic of the Congo, Ethiopia, Ghana, Kenya, Malawi, Mozambique, Namibia, Nigeria, Sierra Leone, Somalia, South Africa, Sudan, Tanzania, Togo, Uganda, Zambia, Zimbabwe, and possibly Burundi. Its natural habitats are rivers, intermittent rivers, and freshwater springs.

References

 Clausnitzer, V. (2005).  Anax speratus.   2006 IUCN Red List of Threatened Species.   Downloaded on 9 August 2007.

Aeshnidae
Insects described in 1867
Taxonomy articles created by Polbot